Dubravka Mijatović (born 27 December 1968) is a Serbian actress.

Film and television career
Dubravka was only  nine years old when she got her first TV role in children's program "Vaga Za Tačno Merenje" along with famed actors Renata Ulmanski, Mija Aleksić. In 1985, Dubravka's film debut was in the film "Nije Lako Sa Muškarcima," she starred with  prominent Serbian actors Milena Dravić, Ljubiša Samardžić, Milivoje Mića Tomić. She graduated from the Faculty Of Dramatic Arts at the University of Belgrade in 1994.

In 1998, she starred in romantic comedy "Tri Palme Za Tri Bitange; "Rat Uživo" (2000); "Jagoda U Supermarketu" (2003). In 1988, Dubravka starred in popular television series "Bolji Život." In 1993, she got a major role in TV series "Happy People," but after a second season she arbitrarily left the show. She was blacklisted by the  state television RTS  because of that scandal. In 2003, she returned on RTS and starred in numerous TV series:  "Kazneni Prostor" (2003); "Stižu Dolari" (2004).

Recently, she is famous for playing Dragorad's wife in Moj rodjak sa sela RTS TV series and a godmother in Bela ladja RTS TV series.

Personal life
Dubravka has two daughters; Iva Radaković with her former husband Goran Radaković and Sara Madžgalj with former partner Marinko Madžgalj.

References

1968 births
21st-century Serbian actresses
Living people
Actresses from Belgrade
Serbian television actresses